Devakanya is a 1943 Indian Tamil language Hindu mythological film directed by R. Padmanaban. The film stars C. Honnappa Bhagavathar and U. R. Jeevarathnam.

Plot
The daughter of a king wants to learn some fine arts. The king arranges a young man who is the son of a palace courtier, to teach music to her. The young man and the princess fall in love and elope. They go to a forest and live there. One day an angel from heaven descends to earth and offers a magical fruit to the young man. Then she makes him also an angel and creates a heavenly place for him. The young man goes away with that angel. The abandoned princess goes in search of her husband and joins a group of street gymnasts. But she dies in an accident. Her body is abandoned. The young man sees the body and remembers his wife. With the help of the magic fruit, he brings her back to life. The angel blesses them.

Cast
The list is adapted from the song book

Male cast
 C. Honnappa Bhagavathar as Umapathi
 T. R. Ramachandran as Rangan
 M. R. Saminathan as Gymnast
 M. S. Murugesan as Yaman 
 T. V. Sethuraman as Chitraguptan
 E. R. Sahadevan as Suravarman
 Joker Ramudu as Wizard
 V. B. S. Mani as Neethivarman
 M. A. Ganapathi Bhat as Maha Vishnu
 K. P. Jayaraman as Kottapuli
 S. A. Padmanabhan as Paramasivan
 P. B. Srinivasan as Gopu
 Chakrapani Iyengar as Nimithakar

Female cast
 U. R. Jeevathnam as Rathnamala
 V. N. Janaki as Chitraleka
 T. S. Jaya as Sundari
 Kalyani as Gurupathni
 K. S. Angamuthu as Gymnast

Support cast
 Loose Arumugam, Vaidyanatha Sharma, Raja Bala, Kantha, Sulochana, Rajam, Shantha, Padma.

Production
The film was produced and directed by R. Padmanaban under the banner Padma Pictures and was filmed at Pragjyothi Studios, located in Adyar. (This studio was closed soon after the second world war.) The story and dialogues were written also by R. Padmanaban and was assisted by Sundara Bhagavathar. Cinematography was done by T. Marconi who was an Italian by birth and was employed by Padmanaban in all his films. Actor Kottapuli Jayaraman earned that nickname after this film only, as the name of the character he featured in was Kottapuli.

Trivia
The cinematographer T. Marconi, being a man from Italy, was detained by the British colonial government during the second world war as an undesirable alien for merely being an Italian citizen! Randor Guy says he was very fond of the South Indian dish "Morekuzhambu". As such, his friends called him "Morekuzhambu" Marconi!

Soundtrack
Music was composed by Palavangudi V. Shama Iyer and the lyrics were penned by S. G. Chellappa Iyer, a brother of S. G. Kittappa. C. Honnappa Bhagavathar, U. R. Jeevarathnam, T. R. Ramachandran, T. S. Jaya, V. N. Janaki, and M. S. Murugesan are singers.

Reception
Film Historian Randor Guy said the film is "Remembered for the interesting story line well-narrated on screen by Padmanabhan and the good performances of Honnappa Bhagavathar, Janaki, Jeevarathnam and Ramachandran."

References

External links
 

Indian black-and-white films